Kostomłoty may refer to the following places in Poland:
Kostomłoty, Lower Silesian Voivodeship (south-west Poland)
Gmina Kostomłoty, a gmina in Lower Silesian Voivodeship, (south-west Poland)
Kostomłoty, Lublin Voivodeship (east Poland)
Kostomłoty Pierwsze, administrative in Kielce County, Świętokrzyskie Voivodeship
Kostomłoty Drugie, a village in Kielce County, Świętokrzyskie Voivodeship